This is a list of player movements for South African Super Rugby teams prior to the end of the 2017 Super Rugby season. Departure and arrivals of all players that were included in a Super Rugby squad for 2016 or 2017 are listed here, regardless of when it occurred. Future-dated transfers are only included if confirmed by the player or his agent, his former team or his new team.

Teams usually name their squads for 2017 – typically containing around 35–40 players – in late 2016 or early 2017. In addition to the main squad, teams can also name additional players that train in backup or development squads for the franchises. These players are denoted by (wider training group) for New Zealand teams, or (extended playing squad) for Australian teams.

Notes 
 2016 players listed are all players that were named in the initial senior squad, or subsequently included in a 23-man match day squad at any game during the season.
 (did not play) denotes that a player did not play at all during one of the two seasons due to injury or non-selection. These players are included to indicate they were contracted to the team.
 (short-term) denotes that a player wasn't initially contracted, but came in during the season. This could either be a club rugby player coming in as injury cover, or a player whose contract had expired at another team (typically in the northern hemisphere). 
 Flags are only shown for players moving to or from another country.
 Players may play in several positions, but are listed in only one.

Transfers

Bulls

Cheetahs

Kings

Lions

Sharks

Stormers

See also

 List of 2016–17 Premiership Rugby transfers
 List of 2016–17 Pro12 transfers
 List of 2016–17 Top 14 transfers
 List of 2016–17 RFU Championship transfers
 SANZAAR
 Super Rugby franchise areas

Notes

References

2016
2016 Super Rugby season
2017 Super Rugby season
2017 in South African rugby union